The Deer Act 1980 (1980 c. 49) was an Act of Parliament in the United Kingdom. It came into operation in November 1980, and has since been fully repealed by the Deer Act 1991.

The main effect of the Act was to put measures in place to prevent the poaching of deer and control the sale of venison. It amended the Deer Act 1963.

References
Whitaker's Almanack: for the year 1982, complete edition, p. 361. J. Whitaker & Sons, London, 1981
Chronological table of the statutes; HMSO, London. 1993.

External links
Deer Act 1980. legislation.gov.uk, The National Archives, UK.

United Kingdom Acts of Parliament 1980
Hunting and shooting in the United Kingdom
Repealed United Kingdom Acts of Parliament
Hunting legislation